Murray Hill may refer to:

Communities and locations
 Murray Hill, Kentucky, a small city in Kentucky
 Murray Hill, Manhattan, a neighborhood in the borough of Manhattan in New York City
 Murray Hill, Queens, a neighborhood in the borough of Queens in New York City
 Murray Hill (New York), an elevation in Herkimer County, New York
 Murray Hill (Ulster County, New York), a mountain
 Murray Hill, New Jersey, an unincorporated area within New Providence, New Jersey and Berkeley Heights, New Jersey
 Murray Hill, Christmas Island, the highest point on Christmas Island
 Murray Hill (Jacksonville), a neighborhood of Jacksonville, Florida
 Murray Hill (Loudoun County, Virginia), a historic estate
 Murray Hill, a neighborhood on the east side of Milwaukee, Wisconsin

Transportation
Murray Hill station (LIRR), in Murray Hill, New York
Murray Hill station (NJ Transit) in Murray Hill, New Jersey
 Murray Hill, a road that forms the apex of Cleveland's Little Italy neighborhood, which is also used eponymously by locals for the neighborhood itself
 A train operated by Amtrak as part of the Clocker service

Other uses
 Murray Hill (house), in Delhi, New York
 Murray Hill (performer), New York–based drag king
 Murray Hill (politician) (1923–2003) born Charles Murray Hill, South Australian MLC and real estate agent
 Murray K. Hill (1865–1942), American vaudeville comic and recording artist 
  
 Murray Hill Incorporated a public relations firm planning to run for a seat in the U.S. Congress